Avigail Sperber (Hebrew: אביגיל שפרבר; born August 24, 1973) is an Israeli cinematographer and film and television director. She is founder and owner of Pardes Film Productions. Sperber is also a social activist, and the founder of Bat Kol - Religious Lesbian Organization.

Biography 
Sperber was born in the Katamon neighborhood of Jerusalem, the daughter of Hannah and Rabbi Daniel Sperber, winner of the Israel Prize for Talmudic study. She studied at the Horev Ulpana (girls' religious school) and did Sherut Leumi {national service} instead of mandatory military service.

In 1998 she completed her studies at Ma'aleh Film School. Her graduation film, Four Men Entered the Grove, won the best film award of her graduating class. Another film she directed, Yan's Tea House, won the best documentary film award at the Haifa International Film Festival.

In 1999, Sperber directed My Sister Benchia, the story of Benchia-Ariela, an Ethiopian girl she met during her national service, whom her family adopted. The film was broadcast on Channel 2.

Sperber worked on the production of the film Campfire, in casting and as the director, Yosef Cedar's, personal assistant, while studying screenwriting at Idit Schori's screenwriting school. Her graduation work was about religious lesbians. Following her work on this script, she founded Bat Kol, an organization for religious lesbians. It was the first religious LGBT organization in Israel. The organization provides support for religious lesbians. Sperber also founded Shoval, which is a dialogue and advocacy group that works for LGBT acceptance in religious society, and operates a support and counseling hotline. These organizations created a new discourse in religious circles, forcing the community to deal with the issue.

She was cinematographer on her ex-girlfriend Netalie Braun's short films Gevald and Metamorphosis; on the Ibtisam Mara'ana's film Badal; on Hannah Azoulay-Hasafri's documentary series My Tiny Empire. In 2008 she directed the film Halakeh, which premiered at the Jerusalem Film Festival and was broadcast on Channel 1. In 2010 she produced and directed Hatalyan with Netalie Braun, a documentary of the story of Shalom Nagar, Adolf Eichmann's executioner. The film won the Best Documentary award at the Haifa International Film Festival, and was one of three outstanding films at IDFA. In 2014, she directed Probation Time, a documentary about her break-up with her partner and their son's difficulties dealing with the new situation, and her family's coping with her adopted sister, who dealt with juvenile delinquency. The film won the DocAviv jury award, and Sperber also won the cinematography award. The film was broadcast on YES Docu as a mini-series.

In September 2017, Sperber was awarded the Minister of Education Award for Jewish Culture in the film category.

Sperber came out as a lesbian at age 25. She has two sons.

Filmography

Director

Production

Cinematography

Awards 

|-
| 2017
| 
| Minister of Education Award for Jewish Culture
| 
| 
|-
| 2014
| Probation Time
| Best Film, DocAviv
| 
| 
|-
| 2014
| Probation Time
| Best Cinematography, DocAviv
| 
| 
|-
| 2014
| Probation Time
| Best Film, Forum of Documentary Filmmakers Awards
| 
| 
|-
| 2014
| Probation Time
| Best Cinematography, Forum of Documentary Filmmakers Awards
| 
| 
|-
| 2013
| Superwomen
| Best Cinematography, DocAviv
| 
| 
|-
| 2011
| Hatalyan
| Best Film, Documentary Film Competition
| 
| 
|-
| 2011
| Hatalyan
| Best Cinematography, Documentary Film Competition
| 
| 
|-
| 2010
| Hatalyan
| Special Honorable Mention, IDFA
| 
| 
|-
| 2010
| Hatalyan
| Best Documentary, Haifa International Film Festival
| 
| 
|}

See also
 List of female film and television directors
 List of lesbian filmmakers

References

External links 

1973 births
Living people
Israeli cinematographers
Israeli women film directors
Israeli women film producers
Israeli lesbian artists
LGBT film directors
LGBT television directors
LGBT producers
LGBT Jews
Israeli activists
Israeli LGBT rights activists
21st-century Israeli LGBT people
Israeli television directors
Israeli women cinematographers
Women television directors